2MASS J04151954−0935066 (also abbreviated to 2MASS 0415−0935) is a brown dwarf of spectral class T8, in the constellation Eridanus about 18.6 light-years from Earth.  This is a reference (standard) object for the definition of the T8 spectral class.

Discovery
2MASS 0415−0935 was discovered in 2002 by Adam J. Burgasser et al. from Two Micron All-Sky Survey (2MASS), conducted from 1997 to 2001. Follow-up observations were made in 1998–2001 using the Near-Infrared Camera, mounted on the Palomar 60 inch (1.5 m) Telescope; CTIO Infrared Imager (CIRIM) and Ohio State Infrared Imager/Spectrometer (OSIRIS), mounted on the Cerro Tololo Inter-American Observatory (CTIO) 1.5 m Telescope; and some additional observations were made using the Near Infrared Camera (NIRC), mounted on the Keck I 10 m telescope, and nearinfrared camera D78, mounted on the Palomar 5 m Hale Telescope. In 2002 Burgasser et al. published a paper, where they defined new spectral subtypes T1—T8, and presented discovery of 11 new T-type brown dwarfs, among which also was 2MASS 0415−0935 — object of the latest known by the time spectral type T8. These 11 objects were among the earliest T-type brown dwarfs ever discovered: before this, the total number of known T-type objects was 13, and these discoveries increased it up to 24 (apart from additional T-type dwarfs, identified by Geballe et al. 2001 in SDSS data).

Distance
Currently the most precise distance estimate of 2MASS 0415−0935 is published in 2012 by Dupuy & Liu trigonometric parallax, measured under The Hawaii Infrared Parallax Program: 175.2 ± 1.7 milliseconds of arc, corresponding to a distance 5.71 ± 0.05 pc, or 18.62 ± 0.18 ly. A less precise parallax of this object, measured under U.S. Naval Observatory Infrared Astrometry Program, was published in 2004 by Vrba et al.

Space motion
Position of 2MASS 0415−0935 shifts due to its proper motion by 2.2553 arcseconds per year (2.2782 ± 0.0012 arcsec, according to Dupuy & Liu (2012)).

Properties
2MASS 0415-0935 belongs to the spectral class T8V; its surface temperature is about 750 kelvins. As with other brown dwarfs of spectral type T, its spectrum was thought to be dominated by methane, although by 2015 with the improved spectroscopic database many of the spectral lines were re-assigned to water. The Research Consortium On Nearby Stars (RECONS) estimates the brown dwarf to be 0.03 solar masses.

See also
The other 10 brown dwarfs, presented in Burgasser et al. (2002):
2MASS 0243−2453 (T6)
2MASS 0727+1710 (T7)
2MASS 0755+2212 (T5)
2MASS 0937+2931 (T6)
2MASS 1534−2952 (T5.5)
2MASS 1546−3325 (T5.5)
2MASS 1553+1532 (T7)
2MASS 2254+3123 (T5)
2MASS 2339+1352 (T5.5)
2MASS 2356−1553 (T6)

References

Further reading

External links
Entry at DwarfArchives.org 

Eridanus (constellation)
Brown dwarfs
T-type stars
J04151954−0935066
Astronomical objects discovered in 2002
TIC objects